Philiodoron is a genus of moths in the family Cossidae.

Species
 Philiodoron cinereum Clench, 1957
 Philiodoron frater Clench, 1957

References

 , 1957: Cossidae from Chile (Lepidoptera). Mitteilungen der Münchner Entomologischen Gesellschaft, 47: 122-142. Full article: .

External links
Natural History Museum Lepidoptera generic names catalog

Hypoptinae
Cossidae genera
Endemic fauna of Chile